"It's Alright" is the only single by Memphis Bleek and Jay-Z that was released from the Streets Is Watching soundtrack for the film of the same name. It was later featured as a bonus track on Jay-Z's third album, Vol. 2... Hard Knock Life. It is produced by Damon Dash and Mahogany Music, who sample "Once in a Lifetime" by the Talking Heads and "The Hall of Mirrors" by Kraftwerk for the track's beat. Its B-side is "The Doe" by Diamonds in da Rough.

Music video
The video was filmed in Cancun, Mexico. Cameo appearances are made by Damon Dash, Kareem "Biggs Burke, Ja Rule and DJ Clue.

Formats and track listings

CD
 "It's Alright" (Clean Version) (4:04)
 "The Doe" (Clean Version) (4:14)

Vinyl

A-side
 "It's Alright" (Clean Version)
 "It's Alright" (Dirty Version)
 "It's Alright" (TV track)

B-side
 "The Doe" (Clean Version)
 "The Doe" (Dirty Version)
 "The Doe" (TV track)

Charts

See also
List of songs recorded by Jay-Z

References

1998 singles
1998 songs
Jay-Z songs
Memphis Bleek songs
Songs written by Brian Eno
Songs written by Tina Weymouth
Songs written by David Byrne
Songs written by Jerry Harrison
Songs written by Chris Frantz
Songs written by Jay-Z
Roc-A-Fella Records singles